The Way, Way Back is a 2013 American coming-of-age comedy-drama film written and directed by Nat Faxon and Jim Rash in their directorial debuts. It stars Liam James as Duncan, an introverted 14-year-old who goes on summer vacation to Wareham, Massachusetts with his mother and her overbearing boyfriend. It also stars Steve Carell, Toni Collette, Allison Janney, AnnaSophia Robb, Sam Rockwell, and Maya Rudolph, with Rob Corddry, Amanda Peet, Faxon, and Rash in supporting roles.

Faxon and Rash conceived the film in the early 2000s; however, it spent several years in development hell before funding could be secured. Eventually, Fox Searchlight Pictures (the same studio which distributed other independent films such as Little Miss Sunshine and Juno) agreed to distribute the film. Filming lasted several months during summer 2012. It premiered at the 2013 Sundance Film Festival, and had a wider release on July 5, 2013, where it received positive reviews and was a box office success, grossing $26.9 million against its $5 million budget.

Plot

Introverted 14-year-old Duncan from Albany, New York, reluctantly goes on summer vacation to a beach house in a small seaside town near Cape Cod, Massachusetts, with his mother, Pam; her wealthy boyfriend, Trent; and Trent's arrogant daughter, Steph. Trent constantly puts Duncan down, frequently making comments and gestures that are condescending and rude to him. Steph follows suit in attitude towards him and is spoiled. 

On the way to the beach house, Trent asks Duncan to rate himself on a scale of one to ten; he says a six while Trent says he thinks he's a three. At the house they are greeted by the neighbors: the gregarious, hard-drinking Betty, her children Susanna and Peter, and married couple Kip and Joan. Later that evening, Duncan and Susanna have an awkward conversation from their adjacent porches.

Duncan discovers a small girl's bicycle in the garage, using it to explore the town. At a pizzaria, he runs into the staff of Water Wizz, the local water park. He meets Owen, who eventually takes him under his wing and shows him around the park. Duncan meets the park's colorful, rag-tag group of employees: Caitlin, Lewis, and Roddy. Several youths at the water park speak reverently of a legendary pass in the tube slide, wondering how it could have been done. Owen hires Duncan for odd jobs at the park.

Outside the park, Duncan is continually neglected by Pam, who indulges in drinking, staying out at night, and smoking marijuana with other adult vacationers. At a Fourth of July cookout, Susanna sees that he is upset and invites him to go hunting for ghost crabs with her and Peter, where they both open up about their absent fathers. Later that night, Duncan witnesses Trent and Joan kissing, but does not tell anyone.

Pam begins to suspect Trent and Joan are having an affair, but he convinces her nothing is going on. Later, Duncan confronts Pam in front of friends and neighbors and tells her to face up to Trent's affair and get rid of him. Trent interjects, and Duncan insults and shoves him; Trent indignantly tells Duncan his divorced father does not want him. 

Duncan stomps away, Susanna follows and comforts him out on the beach. When he tries to kiss her she moves away, which upsets him even more. Accompanied by Peter, Duncan sneaks away to Water Wizz where Owen is throwing a going-away party for Lewis.

After spending all night with his friends at Water Wizz, Duncan is still at the park the next morning, refusing to leave. When Owen confronts him, Duncan opens up about his relationship with Trent and how the water park is the only place where he feels happy and accepted. Owen sympathizes with Duncan, recalling his upbringing where he was forced to abide to strict rules and patterns. He advises Duncan to disregard Trent's criticisms and go his own way.

When Duncan returns to the beach house, Pam tells him they are all leaving. Betty and her kids arrive to say their goodbyes, and Susanna finally kisses Duncan. When Trent stops for gas on their way out of town, Duncan jumps out of the station wagon and runs to Water Wizz, followed by his mother, Trent and Steph. 

Duncan tells Owen and the other employees that he has to leave and tells Owen to follow him. They go to the Devil's Peak slide, and Duncan becomes the first person to ever pass someone in the water slide while the rest of the park watches. 

After finally introducing Owen to his mother, Duncan says goodbye to everyone at the park. Owen tells Pam of Duncan’s good nature, and introduces himself to Trent as "a good friend of the three". Trent then attempts to bypass Owen in order to bring Duncan back to the car, but Owen blocks him and Trent retreats. Duncan hugs and thanks Owen "for everything." Trent, Steph, Pam and Duncan regroup in the car, where Pam finally stands up for herself as they head out of town. Pam climbs to the “way way back” of the car where Duncan is sitting, and they share a smile as Trent's protests are heard in the background.

Cast

Reception

Box office

The film had its premiere screening at the 2013 Sundance Film Festival. It was one of the most financially successful films to come out of the festival that year, outperforming well-known entries and Oscar-nominated films from the previous year. It was released on July 5, 2013 in 19 theaters and surpassed box office expectations, averaging an impressive $30,263 per screen and grossing $525,000 for the weekend. On July 15, 2013, it was added to an additional 60 theaters and grossed $1.1 million. It ended up earning $21.5 million in North America and $5 million elsewhere, for a total of $26.5 million.

Critical response

The Way, Way Back received positive reviews. On Rotten Tomatoes it has a rating of 83% based on 185 reviews, with an average score of 7.30/10. The website's critical consensus states, "Despite its familiar themes, The Way Way Back makes use of its talented cast, finely tuned script, and an abundance of charm to deliver a funny and satisfying coming-of-age story". On Metacritic the film has a weighted average score of 68 out of 100 based on 41 reviews, indicating "generally favorable reviews".

Inkoo Kang of The Village Voice called the film "a crowd-pleasing summer treat, predictable in its sweetness but satisfying all the same". BBC Radio 5 Live film critic Mark Kermode praised the performances of Sam Rockwell, Toni Collette, Allison Janney and Maya Rudolph and similarly reasoned that whilst "it's not world-changing, or earth-shattering" the film is "really sweet and funny". David Gritten of The Daily Telegraph also praised the scene-stealing performances of Janney and Rockwell, concluding that despite a flood of similar coming-of-age films released in 2013 the film "feels warm, funny—and even fresh". Catherine Shoard of The Guardian gave the film a positive review, concluding that "for all the longueurs, there are still enough moments of near brilliance to sustain you through the trip". Betsy Sharkey of the Los Angeles Times commended the film's quirky dialogue and cast performances, calling the film "witty, heartwarming, hopeful, sentimental, searing and relatable".

Sam Rockwell's performance was met with critical praise, with many critics agreeing that his performance was deserving of an Academy Award nomination. MaryAnn Johanson of Flick Filosopher said that Rockwell "makes the biggest splash with a sizzling supporting performance. Not only is he naturally funny, but he has the great ability to make every sharp line of dialogue sound freshly improvised."

A.A. Dowd of The A.V. Club gave the film a C+, describing it as "generically constructed" and "never as refreshing as it's constantly straining to be".

Accolades

Soundtrack
Heather Phares of AllMusic gave the film's soundtrack 7 out of 10 stars, saying:

 "For the Time Being" – Edie Brickell/The Gaddabouts
 "Kyrie" – Mr. Mister
 "Out the Door" – Ben Kweller
 "Come and See" – Young Galaxy
 "Running Wild" – Army Navy
 "Young Blood" – UFO
 "Shine" – Wild Belle
 "New Sensation" – INXS
 "Sneaking Sally Through the Alley" – Robert Palmer
 "Young at Heart" – The Rondo Brothers/Tim Myers
 "Recess" – Eli "Paperboy" Reed
 "Power Hungry Animals" – The Apache Relay
 "Alone" – Trampled by Turtles
 "Go Where the Love Is" – Edie Brickell/The Gaddabouts
 "The Way Way Back" – Rob Simonsen

Other songs
 "Can't Fight This Feeling" – REO Speedwagon

References

External links

 
 
 
 

2013 films
2013 comedy-drama films
2013 directorial debut films
2013 independent films
2010s coming-of-age comedy-drama films
2010s teen comedy-drama films
American coming-of-age comedy-drama films
American independent films
American teen comedy-drama films
Films about dysfunctional families
Films about vacationing
Films directed by Nat Faxon
Films scored by Rob Simonsen
Films set in Albany, New York
Films set in Massachusetts
Films set in water parks
Films set on beaches
Films shot in Massachusetts
Odd Lot Entertainment films
Films about mother–son relationships
2010s English-language films
2010s American films
TSG Entertainment films